Mount Gravatt Australian Football Club, is a Brisbane based club which competed in the North East Australian Football League competition from 2011–2013 and as of 2014 is a member club of the Queensland Australian Football League., formed in 1964.

SQAFA/BAFL

The club was a member of the SQAFA since the early 1970s, It won premierships in 1971, 1972, 1974 and 1983.

QAFL

The club had been affiliated with AFL Queensland since 1994. The club won premiership in 2002 & 2007, whilst being runners up in 1996, 1997, 2003 and 2009.

NEAFL

The club is a founding member of the competition, Its first season it finished second on the ladder and lost the Preliminary Final.

Club song 
The club song is sung to the tune of Road to Gundagai.

AFL/VFL players 
These are the list of past and present Mount Gravatt players who have played at AFL/VFL as the Brisbane Lions or the Brisbane Bears:

Rohan Bail - Melbourne
Clay Cameron - Gold Coast
Jarrod Cotton - Port Adelaide
Michael Gibson - Fitzroy and Brisbane Bears
Will Hamill - Brisbane Lions
Shaun Hampson - Carlton and Richmond
Ben Hudson - Adelaide, Western Bulldogs, Brisbane Lions and Collingwood
Stephen Kenna - Carlton
Tony Lynn - Brisbane Bears and Carlton
Joel Macdonald - Brisbane Lions and Melbourne
Brad Miller - Melbourne and Richmond
Neville Miller - South Melbourne
Shane Morrison - Brisbane Lions and Richmond
Ken Peucker (1935–2005) - Essendon
Albert Proud - Brisbane Lions
Archie Smith - Brisbane Lions
Darryl White - Brisbane Bears and Brisbane Lions
Derek Wirth - Brisbane Lions

Premierships (2)

Individual honours 

Grogan Medal

The Grogan Medal is the highest individual honour a single player can win in the Queensland state league. Votes are awarded by the umpires to the best and fairest players of each game. The Grogan Medal is Queensland equivalent to the AFL's Brownlow Medal.

Mount Gravatt has a total of two Grogan Medallists. The first, in 1999, was won by the captain, Brad Jones. The second was by another captain, Mick Stinear in 2004. This was a remarkable effort considering the vultures finished 5th for the season.

Joe Grant Medal

The Joe Grant Medal is awarded to the player judged best on field in a grand final. Mount Gravatt has two Joe Grant Medallists. The first was Tony Lynn in the 2002 grand final victory, and the second was Ash Evans in the 2007 grand final victory.

Ray Hughson Medal

The Ray Hughson Medal is awarded to the QAFL leading goal kicker at the end of the year. Mount Gravatt has one Ray Hughson Medallist: Shane Dupuy, who kicked 80 goals in the 1996 season.

References

External links

Official website
Full Points Footy profile for Mount Gravatt

Mt Gravatt
Australian rules football clubs in Brisbane
1964 establishments in Australia
Australian rules football clubs established in 1964